Purgatory Afterglow is the fourth full-length studio album by Swedish death metal band Edge of Sanity. The album was recorded by Dan Swanö in Unisound Studios, Örebro, Sweden, in July 1994 and released in 1994 by Black Mark Production.

There are two different versions of the CD; a mirror-like disc with black letters and a black disc with gold letters. The Japanese release features the tracks "Until Eternity Ends" and "Eternal Eclipse" from the Until Eternity Ends EP. A music video was made for the song "Black Tears".

The album is dedicated to the memory of Kurt Cobain.

Legacy
In July 2014, Guitar World ranked Purgatory Afterglow at number 35 in their "Superunknown: 50 Iconic Albums That Defined 1994" list.

"Black Tears" was covered by the bands Eternal Tears of Sorrow, on their album Chaotic Beauty, and Heaven Shall Burn, on their album Iconoclast (Part 1: The Final Resistance).

Track listing

Personnel
Edge of Sanity
 Dan Swanö – lead vocals, lead guitar (on tracks 3, 4 and 5), acoustic guitar (on track 5), harmony guitar (on tracks 6 and 9), keyboards (on tracks 1 & 5)
 Andreas Axelsson – lead vocals (on track 10), backing vocals (on tracks 2 & 7), lead guitar (on track 8), rhythm guitar, harmony guitar (on track 7)
 Sami Nerberg – lead vocals (on track 10), lead guitar (on track 8), rhythm guitar
 Anders Lindberg – bass guitar
 Benny Larsson – drums, percussion

Production
 Dan Swanö – engineering
 Necrolord – cover art
 Peter in de Betou – mastering
 Börje Forsberg – executive producer
 Åsa Jonsén – photography

References

Edge of Sanity albums
1994 albums
Albums with cover art by Kristian Wåhlin